Fanna-Fi-Allah is a Canadian–American group which plays Qawwali, a form of Sufi devotional music popular in South Asia.

Origins 
Group leader Tahir Faridi Qawwal (formerly Geoffrey Lyons), originally from Nova Scotia, studied Indian classical music with the tabla maestro Harjeet Seyan Singh in India as a teenager. At 17, he converted to Islam and studied under qawwali masters Rahet Fateh Ali Khan, Pashupatinath Mishra, Sher Ali Khan and Muazzam Qawwal in Pakistan.

Aminah Chishti — aka Jessica Ripper, originally from Ashland, Oregon —  is a student of Rahat Fateh Ali Khan successor of Nusrat Fateh Ali Khan and Ustad Dildar Hussain (who played with Ustad Nusrat Fateh Ali Khan for more than 28 years) and in 2003 became the first female tabla player to be initiated into the lineage of Qawwali.

Qawwal and Chishti started Fanna-Fi-Allah Sufi Qawwali Ensemble in 2001.

Members

 Tahir Faridi Qawwal – Vocals, Harmonium, Tabla
 Aminah Chishti Qawwal – Tabla, Vocals
 Laali Qalandar – Vocals, Clapping
 Salim Chishti – Vocals, Clapping
 Ali Shan – Vocals, Clapping
Jahangir Baba – Harmonium, Vocals
 Abrar Hussain – Tabla, Vocals, Clapping
Aziz Abbatiello – Whirling

Discography
 Fanna-Fi-Allah (2018) Muraqaba (Released by Buda Musique France Recorded at Woodshed Studios Malibu courtesy of Chris Martin (Cold Play))
 Fanna-Fi-Allah (2017) – Live @ Great American Music Hall (Vinyl)
 Fanna-Fi-Allah Sufi Qawwali (2015)
 Fanna_Fi-Allah Sufi Qawwali tracks: 
 Man Kunto Maula (2014)
 Mehfil-e-Sama Vol. 3 (2014)
 Naubat Nagare (2013)
 Ya Mustafa Nur-Ul-Khuda (2012)
 Fanna-Fi-Allah Sufi Qawwali Party
 Mehfil-e-Sama Vol. 2 (2012)
 Damahama Dam Ali Ali (2011)
 Mehfil-e-Sama Vol. 1 (2008)
 Baba Farid (2007)
 Annihilation Into the Infinite (2005)
 Rizwan Muazzam
 Amad (2014)
 Araj Sun Li Jo Mori (2014)
 Sufi Sama (2007)
 Rizwan Muazzam Qawwali
 Karlo Ganj-e-Shakar (2011)
 Sher Ali Mehr Ali
 Hamare Khwaja (2013)
 Tahir Qawwal
 Alif Allah, Pt. 1 (2013)
 Alif Allah, Pt. 2 (2013)
 Alif Allah, Pt. 3 (2013)
 Bhairavi Thumri (Ras Ke Bare Tore Nain) (2013)
 Temple Step
 Alif Allah (Remix) (2014)
 Various Artists
 Dayar-e-Ishq: Abode of Divine Love (2013)

References

External links
 
Biography on Fanna-Fi-Allah.com
Fanna-Fi-Allah on AllMusic

American world music groups
Canadian world music groups
Harmonium players
Hindi-language singers
Performers of Sufi music
Punjabi-language singers
Qawwali
Sufism in Canada
Sufism in the United States
Tabla players
Urdu-language singers